Mitchler Run is a tributary of Huntington Creek in Luzerne County, Pennsylvania, in the United States. The stream is considered by the Pennsylvania Fish and Boat Commission to be Class A Wild Trout Waters for brook trout.

Course

Mitchler Run begins near the base of a mountain in Ross Township. It flows east for several hundred feet before turning south-southwest and entering a valley. After several tenths of a mile, the stream crosses Pennsylvania Route 118 and continues flowing south-southwest. Some distance further downstream, it turns southeast. After several hundred feet, it reaches its confluence with Huntington Creek.

Tributaries
No tributaries of Mitchler Run, named or unnamed, are shown on The National Map. However, a 1958 map by the Pennsylvania Fish Commission shows several unnamed tributaries (but no named tributaries) of the stream.

Hydrology, geography, and watershed

The concentration of alkalinity in Mitchler Run is 20 milligrams per liter.

Mitchler Run is entirely in the United States Geological Survey quadrangle of Sweet Valley. The stream is also entirely on land that is private property and closed to the public.

History
Mitchler Run's identifier in the Geographic Names Information System is 1181380. The stream was entered into the Geographic Names Information System on August 2, 1979. Mitchler Run has had its name since at least 1958, when it was on a map created by the Pennsylvania Fish Commission.

Biology
Mitchler Run is considered by the Pennsylvania Fish and Boat Commission to be Class A Wild Trout Waters between its headwaters and its mouth. It is inhabited by brook trout. The stream is one of six direct tributaries of Huntington Creek to be designated as Class A Wild Trout Waters. The others are Shingle Run, Arnold Creek, Lick Branch, Phillips Creek, and part of Kitchen Creek.

See also
Laurel Run (Huntington Creek), next tributary of Huntington Creek going downstream
List of tributaries of Fishing Creek (North Branch Susquehanna River)
List of rivers of Pennsylvania

References

External links

Mitchler Run on Google Maps
Mitchler Run on historicmapworks.com

Rivers of Luzerne County, Pennsylvania
Tributaries of Fishing Creek (North Branch Susquehanna River)
Rivers of Pennsylvania